George al-Nghayweh military base ( Thouknat George al-Nghayweh) is a Lebanese Army base under the jurisdiction of the North regional command (Bahjat Ghanem military base). Founded on October 16, 1992, the military base was named after Commando George al-Nhgayweh and is located in Andqit, North Governorate.

Mission
The mission of the military base includes:
 Providing services to its active and retired personnel and their families. Services include healthcare, educational aid, renewing medical ID's, etc.
 Participating in rescue missions, firefighting and development programs
 Supplying food, medicine and lubricants to the deployed units in the region

See also
 Bahjat Ghanem military base
 North Governorate

References

Lebanese Army bases